Tan Lioe Ie (born 1 June 1958, Denpasar) is an Indonesian poet, the first poet in Indonesia who uses Chinese symbolic images in his poetry. Among friends he is called as Yokie.

Brief biography 
He was born and lives on the island of Bali. He studied architecture at the Jakarta University which he hasn't  graduated. In 1996, he completed the management course at the Faculty of Economics of Udayana University (Denpasar). He works as an editor of the cultural magazines “Cak” and “Paradoks”. Participant of poetry festivals in Indonesia, Holland, France, Tasmania, Suriname, South Africa. He used to be also a guitarist of the band "Ariesta".  A member of the literary association "Sanggar Minum Kopi".

Creativity 
He is an adherent of the so-called musicalization of poetry (the performance of poems accompanied by music). He writes and publishes poems in the newspapers “Bali Post”, “Berita Buana”, “Suara Merdeka”, “Kompas”, “Media Indonesia”, Bali-The Morning, Coast Lines Australia), literary journal "Horison". The author of the five collections of poetry, including two on CDs. The most popular poems are Catatan Gila (Crazy Notes), Perahu Daun (Leaf Ship), Mimpi Buruk (Nightmare), Tak Lagi (Nevermore). In addition, the poems of the poet are included in nine collective anthologies. The poems are translated into English, Bulgarian, Dutch, Chinese, German, Russian and French.

Awards 
 The first place in the National Poetry Contest (Literary Association "Sanggar Minum Kopi", 1990)
 Prize of the "Yayasan Taraju" Foundation (1994)

Main Collections
 Kita Bersaudara (We are brothers) (1991), English version “We Are All One” (1996, translated by Thomas Hunter)
 Malam Cahaya Lampion (2005) (The Night of Chinese Lanterns), Dutch language version “Nach Van De Lampionen” (translated by Linde Waugh). 
 Exorcism (disc with verses accompanied by music performed by the author) (2010)
 Kuda Putih (White Horse) (CD with verses accompanied by music performed by the author) (2012)
 Ciam Si: Puisi-puisi Ramalan (Chiam Si: Poems of Predictions) (2015).

Participation in collective anthologies 
 Perjalanan (Traveling) (1990)
 Taksu (Holiness) (1991)
 The Gingseng (1993)
 Sahayun (1994)
 Kebangkitan Nusantara I & II (Awakening of Nusantara I & II) (1994, 1995)
 Cerita Dari Hutan Bakau (History from the mangrove forest) (1996)
 Mencari Mimpi (In search of a dream) (2016).

Family 
 Father Tan Tien Hwie, mother Tan Cecilia.
 Spouse Ida Ayu Nyoman Suwiti

See also 
 http://www.jendelasastra.com/dapur-sastra/dapur-jendela-sastra/lain-lain/puisi-puisi-tan-lioe-ie Poetry of the poet
 https://www.youtube.com/watch?v=rCUPMlVIBS0 Musicalization of the poem "Sim Sim Salabim"

References 

Indonesian male poets
1958 births
Living people
Indonesian people of Chinese descent